Lampronia redimitella is a moth of the family Prodoxidae. It is found in Fennoscandia, the Baltic region, Poland, the Czech Republic and Germany.

The wingspan is 9-11.5 mm. The forewings are brown with a purple and yellowish sheen and two pale yellow transverse bands. Adults are on wing in May and June.

The larvae feed on the buds of Ribes spicatum and Ribes alpinum.

References

Moths described in 1846
Prodoxidae
Moths of Europe